Marcos Bristow is an Indian former badminton player. He was the silver medalist in the badminton at the 1998 Commonwealth Games in the Men's Team event.

Achievements

South Asian Games

IBF International

References

Living people
Indian male badminton players
Commonwealth Games medallists in badminton
Commonwealth Games silver medallists for India
Badminton players at the 1998 Commonwealth Games
1970 births
South Asian Games gold medalists for India
South Asian Games silver medalists for India
South Asian Games medalists in badminton
Medallists at the 1998 Commonwealth Games